Conte Giuseppe Fede (died 1777) was an Italian nobleman, collector and archaeologist of the 18th century.  As early as 1724 he started to buy up parcels of land on the site of Hadrian's Villa at Tivoli (which had become divided up among a multitude of owners) and excavate on them.  Like his father, he was a collector-excavator who retained some of the sculptures he excavated for himself whilst releasing others onto the antiquarian market.

He had at least four of the sculptures he found restored by Bartolomeo Cavaceppi before 1768, and Cavaceppi included sculptures found by Fede in his Raccolta.

References

Primary sources
Winckelmann, Briefe, Numbers 150, 486, I, 455 (bibl.)
Johann Bernoulli, Sammlung kurzer Reisebeschreibungen und anderer zur Erweiterung der Länder-und Menschenkenntnis dienender Nachrichten (Berlin, Altenburg & Berlin, Leipzig, Berlin & Dessau, 1781-1782), II, 607
Carlo Pietrangeli, Scavi e scoperte di antichita sotto il pontificato di Pio VI (1700), plates 146-148

Secondary sources
Georg Lippold, Die Skulpturen des Vatikanischen Museums (1936), III, 2, pages 107-108, 558 ("dall eridita del Conte Giuseppe Fede...1777")
Friedrich Noack, Das Deutschtum in Rom seit dem Ausgang des Mittelalters II, 160, 202 (passage about Giuseppe's father)
 Seymour Howard, 'An Antiquarian Handlist and Beginnings of the Pio-Clementino', Eighteenth-Century Studies (The Johns Hopkins University Press), 1973, p54 
Francis Haskell and Nicholas Penny, Taste and the Antique: The Lure of Classical Sculpture 1500-1900 (Yale University Press) 1981

1777 deaths
Italian antiquarians
Italian archaeologists
Italian art collectors
Counts of Italy
Year of birth unknown